Short Mat Bowls is a generally indoor based bowls sport, played on a carpet. Whilst the game is heavily played throughout the United Kingdom, it is also played throughout Europe, and also places such as India, Australia, New Zealand and Japan. National, and international level events are generally held for all disciplines, including singles, pairs, triples and fours.

Notable National competitions

England

St Georges Cup

The St Georges Cup began in 2011, with 32 players from the North of England against 32 players from the South of England in a Ryder Cup-style event.

English Inter County Championship

The ESMBA organise an inter-county championship for teams of 20 players from each county. Most counties will enter two teams, a first 'premier' team, and an 'A team'. Winners of the premier competition are invited to the Top County competition, where the winners of the English ICC play the Welsh & Irish winners. Teams are made up of two teams from each discipline (Singles, pairs, triples & fours).

International championships

World Short Mat Bowls Championships

The Short Mat World Championships is held every two years in one of its member states. Whilst this may usually be inside the United Kingdom, teams such as India and Italy also compete; and thus could host the championships. Unlike the British Isles championships above, the world championships allows nations to enter up to two teams to each discipline; as there is no team event. There is also a knockout system in place after the first round-robin round. These tournaments are run by a group known as the World Short Mat Bowls Council.

British Isles Championships
Each year, winners of the national championships of each of the home nations (Although Ireland are usually represented as one country), along with a team selected by their governing body compete in the British Isles Championships. Despite being open to entry to all competition, the Isle of Man generally only competes in the singles competition. The winner is traditionally decided in a round-robin format, with the winner being the team with the most points, and shot difference.

The team competition for the British Isles championship is sixteen against sixteen; known as rinks. Each team deploys four teams of four over four mats, and the winning team is the one with the most combined shots over every mat. Although traditionally frowned upon, it is possible for players in the 'individual' disciplines, to also play in the team event. In this way, it is possible for players to win two British Isles titles in one season.

Current Champions:

International Short Mat Open 
The International Open was the biggest open competition in Short Mat Bowls when it first started in 2010. The competition was organised by Craig Burgess and Barry Hedges of Essex; both of the trophies awarded are in memory of their fathers, John Burgess and David Hedges. The inaugural event was held at Kempston Indoor Bowls Club, Bedford, England, and had the biggest gathering of short mat bowls talent from all over Europe including England, Ireland, Wales, Scotland, Belgium and Sweden. In subsequent years, the John Burgess Trophy became a pairs event instead of the original triples format. The event finished in 2013.

Short Mat Players Tour

The Short Mat Players Tour (SMPT), is a company responsible of events set up by Craig Burgess and Simon Pridham in 2011. The SMPT are responsible for running events throughout Europe, the first to establish a world ranking system.

Current Singles Events

Current Team Events

Past ranking tournaments

References

External links
 Short mat bowls rules and equipment

Ball games
Bowls